The Svalbard Museum is a museum in Longyearbyen, the largest town in the Svalbard archipelago. The museum displays artifacts from the history of Svalbard since its settlement, and exhibits of local plants and animals. Its exhibitions describe the factors that support human activity in Svalbard, showing the close relationship between nature and human cultural history on the islands. "Life in Light and Ice" is the museum's core exhibit. It describes the history of the archipelago, from the first whalers to the present society based on mining, research, and tourism.

The museum is housed in the University Centre in Svalbard building.

The Svalbard Museum was awarded the 2008 Council of Europe Museum Prize, awarded annually by the Committee on Culture, Science and Education of the Parliamentary Assembly of the Council of Europe (under the European Museum of the Year Award scheme of the European Museum Forum). The award is given annually to a European museum which (among other criteria) is judged to have made a significant contribution to the understanding of European cultural heritage.

References

External links
Svalbard Museum website

Museums in Svalbard
History museums in Norway
Local museums in Norway
University Centre in Svalbard